Melpathy or Melpathi, is a village in Viluppuram district located between Chennai and Tanjur National Highway NH45C and close to Puducherry and Villupuram.

References

Villages in Viluppuram district